Ignaz Berndaner (born 4 July 1954, in Garmisch-Partenkirchen) is an ice hockey player who played for the West German national team. He won a bronze medal at the 1976 Winter Olympics. He also represented West Germany at the 1984 Canada Cup.

References

External links
 
 
 
 

1954 births
Living people
Sportspeople from Garmisch-Partenkirchen
Ice hockey players at the 1976 Winter Olympics
Ice hockey players at the 1984 Winter Olympics
Olympic ice hockey players of West Germany
West German ice hockey defencemen
Olympic medalists in ice hockey
Olympic bronze medalists for West Germany
Medalists at the 1976 Winter Olympics
SC Riessersee players
Recipients of the Silver Laurel Leaf
German ice hockey defencemen